Kavaia Rawaqa (born 20 September 1990) is a Fijian footballer who plays as a defender for Fijian club Lautoka and the Fiji national team.

Club career
Rawaqa started his career with Labasa. After he played for Lautoka, Nadi, again Labasa, he now plays for Lautoka. With the club, he won the 2017 Fiji National Football League.

International career
In 2012 Rawaqa was called up for the 2012 OFC Men's Olympic Qualifying Tournament. Fiji reached the final but lost by 1 goal to nil against New Zealand. Rawaqa didn't play in the final and semi-final but he was in the starting line up in all three group games against the Solomon Islands (2–0 win), American Samoa (7–1 win) and Vanuatu (2–1 win).
In 2017 Rawaqa was called up by coach Christophe Gamel for the Fiji national football team. He made his debut on 27 March 2017, in a 2–0 loss to New Zealand when he played the whole game as a left back.

References

Living people
1990 births
Fijian footballers
Association football goalkeepers
Fiji international footballers
Nadi F.C. players
Labasa F.C. players
Lautoka F.C. players